This was the first edition of the tournament.

Stefano Travaglia won the title after defeating Guido Andreozzi 6–3, 6–3 in the final.

Seeds

Draw

Finals

Top half

Bottom half

References
Main Draw
Qualifying Draw

Casino Admiral Trophy - Singles